A list of churches in West Lothian, Scotland:

Abercorn Church 
Breich Valley Parish Church
Brucefield Church
Centrepoint Church
Kingscavil Church
Mid Calder Parish Church 
St Andrew's Church, Craigshill
St Cuthbert's Church, East Calder
St Michael's Parish Church, Linlithgow 
St Nicholas Church, Uphall
Torphichen Preceptory
Ladywell Baptist Church
Dedridge Baptist Church
Broxburn Baptist Church
Limefield:West Calder United Free Church

External links

Churches in West Lothian
West Lothian